Hamstead should not be confused with any of the many places called Hampstead.

Hamstead is a small rural settlement on the Isle of Wight. It is located about three miles east of Yarmouth, in the northwest of the island. According to the Post Office the 2011 census population of the village was included in the civil parish of Shalfleet.

Hamlets on the Isle of Wight